William Edward McManus  (January 27, 1914 – March 3, 1997) was a 20th-century bishop of the Catholic Church in the United States.  He served as an auxiliary bishop of the Archdiocese of Chicago in Illinois from 1967 to 1976 and bishop of the Diocese of Fort Wayne-South Bend in Indiana from 1976 to 1985.

Biography
William McManus was born on April 15, 1939, in Chicago, Illinois.  He was ordained a priest on April 15, 1939, for the Archdiocese of Chicago by Cardinal George Mundelein.

Auxiliary Bishop of Chicago  
On June 11, 1967, McManus was named titular bishop of Mesarfelta and auxiliary bishop of the Archdiocese of Chicago by Pope Paul VI.  He was consecrated on August 24, 1967, by Cardinal John Cody. Bishops Cletus F. O'Donnell and Aloysius John Wycislo were the principal co-consecrators.

Bishop of Fort Wayne-South Bend 
On August 24, 1976, Paul VI named McManus as the seventh bishop of the Diocese of Fort Wayne-South Bend.  He was installed in Fort Wayne on October 29, 1976.   

Pope John Paul II accepted McManus' resignation as bishop of Fort Wayne-South Bend on February 18, 1985.William McManus died on March 3, 1997, at age 83 in Des Plaines, Illinois.

See also

References

1914 births
1997 deaths
20th-century Roman Catholic bishops in the United States
Roman Catholic Archdiocese of Chicago
Clergy from Chicago
Roman Catholic bishops of Fort Wayne–South Bend
Religious leaders from Illinois
Catholics from Illinois